The Indonesia national cricket team is the men's team that represents the country of Indonesia in international cricket. Cricket in Indonesia is governed by Cricket Indonesia (formerly the Indonesia Cricket Foundation). Cricket Indonesia became an affiliate member of the International Cricket Council (ICC) in 2001 and an associate member in 2017.

Cricket Indonesia is charged with the promotion and development of cricket in Indonesia, and is a member of the ICC East Asia-Pacific (EAP) development region. In 2006, the organisation announced their intention to join the Asian Cricket Council, and were originally included in the draw for the ACC Trophy, although their membership of the ACC was rejected and they did not take part in the tournament.

The Indonesian national team made its international debut in 2002, at a tournament in Perth, Australia, that also included Japan and South Korea. The team's first ICC event was the 2005 EAP Cup in Vanuatu, where it placed fifth out of six teams. Indonesia has since regularly participated in EAP regional tournaments. At 2014 EAP Championship, the most recent such event, Indonesia placed seventh out of eight teams, in front of only the Cook Islands.

In April 2018, the ICC decided to grant full Twenty20 International (T20I) status to all its members. Therefore, all Twenty20 matches played between Indonesia and other ICC members after 1 January 2019 will be a full T20I. The current Indonesia women's national cricket team is ranked 22nd in the world while the Men's are 80th by the end of 2019.

History

21st century
Since the Indonesian Cricket Foundation (now Cricket Indonesia) was formed in 2000, Indonesia have played in several regional tournaments in the East Asia-Pacific region. Including the East-Asia Pacific Challenge in 2004, and in the 2005 ICC EAP Cricket Cup.

In August 2017, Indonesia Men's team won a bronze medal in the 20-over tournament in cricket at the 2017 Southeast Asian Games. They also played in the 50-over tournament, but lost all four matches (including to Myanmar, giving that country its first victory in international cricket).

In February 2023, it was announced that Indonesia and Japan would be included in Asian Cricket Council (ACC) pathway events, while remaining in the ICC East Asia-Pacific development region.

Grounds

Tournaments

World Cricket League EAP region
 2005: ICC EAP Cricket Cup 5th
 2007: ICC EAP Cricket Trophy 6th
 2009: ICC EAP Cricket Trophy Division Two 5th
 2011: ICC EAP Cricket Trophy Division Two 6th
2018: 2018–19 ICC T20 World Cup East Asia-Pacific Qualifier

Records

International Match Summary — Indonesia
 
Last updated 18 October 2022

Twenty20 International 

T20I record versus other nations

Records complete to T20I #1831. Last updated 18 October 2022.

Other matches
For a list of selected international matches played by Indonesia, see Cricket Archive.

See also
Indonesia women's national cricket team
Cricket Indonesia
List of Indonesia Twenty20 International cricketers

References

External links 
International Cricket Council Member Profile – Indonesia

Cricket in Indonesia
National cricket teams
Cricket
Indonesia in international cricket